Tyasha Pearl Desiree Harris (born May 1, 1998) is an American professional basketball player for the Connecticut Sun of the Women's National Basketball Association (WNBA). She played college basketball for the South Carolina Gamecocks. Harris was selected to third team All-American by the Associated Press (AP) and by the U.S. Basketball Writers Association (USBWA) in 2020. She is also the winner of the 2020 Dawn Staley Award, which is named after her coach at South Carolina.

College career
Harris is the first Gamecock to record 700 assists. Her career total of 705 assists ranked 10th all-time in SEC. In June 2020, Harris was named the Southeastern Conference 2019-20 Female Athlete of the Year.

Professional career

Dallas Wings
Harris entered the 2020 WNBA draft, where she was selected by the Dallas Wings in the first round  as the seventh overall pick in the draft.

In January of 2023, the Wings traded Harris to the Connecticut Sun, as part of a three-team deal.

WNBA career statistics

Regular season 

|-
| style="text-align:left;"| 2020
| style="text-align:left;"| Dallas
| 21 || 3 || 19.6 || .433 || .339 || .636 || 1.2 || 2.7 || 0.9 || 0.1 || 0.9 || 6.8
|-
| style="text-align:left;"| 2021
| style="text-align:left;"| Dallas
| 32 || 3 || 16.3 || .336 || .339 || .833 || 1.6 || 2.7 || 0.4 || 0.3 || 1.0 || 4.4
|-
| style="text-align:left;"| 2022
| style="text-align:left;"| Dallas
| 35 || 5 || 15.8 || .416 || .309 || .792 || 0.9 || 2.8 || 0.4 || 0.1 || 1.1 || 5.0
|-
| style="text-align:left;"| Career
| style="text-align:left;"| 3 years, 1 team
| 88 || 11 || 16.9 || .394 || .329 || .763 || 1.2 || 2.7 || 0.5 || 0.2 || 1.0 || 5.2

Postseason 

|-
| style="text-align:left;"| 2021
| style="text-align:left;"| Dallas
| 1 || 0 || 7.0 || .000 || .000 || .000 || 0.0 || 1.0 || 0.0 || 0.0 || 0.0 || 0.0
|-
| style="text-align:left;"| 2022
| style="text-align:left;"| Dallas
| 3 || 0 || 17.3 || .368 || .286 || 1.000 || 2.3 || 2.3 || 0.3 || 0.3 || 1.3 || 6.0
|-
| style="text-align:left;"| Career
| style="text-align:left;"| 2 years, 1 team
| 4 || 0 || 14.8 || .318 || .250 || 1.000 || 1.8 || 2.0 || 0.3 || 0.3 || 1.0 || 4.5

College Statistics

South Carolina

|-
| style="text-align:left; background:#afe6ba;"| 2016–17†
| style="text-align:left;"| South Carolina
| 37 || 27 || 26.3 || .429 || .333 || .673 || 2.0 || 3.2 || 1.0 || 0.2 || 1.6 || 5.6
|-
| style="text-align:left;"| 2017–18
| style="text-align:left;"| South Carolina
| 36 || 35 || 33.6 || .418 || .299 || .745 || 3.4 || 6.1 || 2.2 || 0.2 || 2.6 || 10.4
|-
| style="text-align:left;"| 2018–19
| style="text-align:left;"| South Carolina
| 33 || 32 || 31.5 || .398 || .307 || .854 || 3.5 || 5.3 || 1.7 || 0.3 || 1.7 || 10.9
|-
| style="text-align:left;"| 2019–20*
| style="text-align:left;"| South Carolina
| 33 || 33 || 28.7 || .426 || .384 || .857 || 3.5 || 5.7 || 1.6 || 0.1 || 2.1 || 12.0
|- class="sortbottom"
| style="text-align:center;" colspan="2"| Career
| 139 || 127 || 30.0 || .417 || .328 || .792 || 3.1 || 5.1 || 1.6 || 0.2 || 2.0 || 9.6

* 2020 NCAA tournament cancelled due to COVID-19 pandemic
Source: gamecocksonline.com

Personal life 
Tyasha Harris is the daughter of Shannon-Greer Harris and Bruce Harris. She has an older brother, Bruce, and two younger sisters, Talia and Tamara. She is a major in Sports and Entertainment Management.

References

1998 births
Living people
All-American college women's basketball players
American women's basketball players
Basketball players at the 2019 Pan American Games
Basketball players from Indiana
Dallas Wings draft picks
Dallas Wings players
Pan American Games medalists in basketball
Pan American Games silver medalists for the United States
Point guards
South Carolina Gamecocks women's basketball players
Medalists at the 2019 Pan American Games
United States women's national basketball team players